The highest-selling singles in Japan are ranked in the weekly Oricon Singles Chart, which is published by Oricon Style magazine. The data are compiled by Oricon based on each singles' weekly physical sales. This list includes the singles that reached the number one place on that chart in 2005.

Chart history

References 

2005 in Japanese music
Japan Oricon
Lists of number-one songs in Japan